The Ministry of Justice of Mauritania is responsible for sector policy planning, juvenile justice and judicial reform, drafting and distributing legislative texts, and prison administration.

List of ministers (1970-present) 
 Maloum Ould Braham (1970-1972)
 Abdullahi Ould Boye (1972-1975)
 Maloum Ould Braham (1976-1977)
 Chiekh Saad Bouh Kane (1978)
 Ba Ould Ne (1978-1979)
 Yadalli Ould Cheikh (1980)
 Abdel Aziz Ould Ahmed (1981-1984)
 Chiekh Ould Boide (1984)
 Djibril Ould Abdallah (1985)
 Moulaye Ould Boukhreiss (1986)
 Hamdy Samba Diop (1986-1987)
 Chiekh Mohamed Salem Ould Mohamed Lemine (1988-1990)
 Sow Adama Samba Bohoum (1990-1992)
 Sow Abou Damba (1992-1995)
 Mohamed Lemine Salem Ould Dah (1996-1997)
 Mohamed Ould Mohamed Vall Sidi (1998)
 Mohamed Ould Ahmed Lemine (1998-2000)
 Sidi Mahmoud Ould Cheikh Ahmed Lemrabott (2000-2001)
 Sghair Ould M’Bareck (2001-2003)
 Diabira Bakary (2003-2005)
 Maafoudh Ould Bettah (2005-2007)
 Limam Ould Teguedi (2007-2008)
 Ahmedou Tidjane Bal (2008-2011)
 Abidine Ould Kheir (2011-2014)
 Sidi Ould Zeine (2014-2017)
 Brahim Ould Daddah (2017-2018)
 Dia Moctar Malal (2018-2019)
Haimouda Ould Ramdane (2019–2020)
 Mohamed Mahmoud Ould Abdoullah Ould Boye ( 2020-present)

See also 
 Justice ministry
 Politics of Mauritania

References 

Justice ministries
Government of Mauritania